Rubén Palomeque Juárez (born 12 September 1994) is a Spanish footballer who plays for El Ejido.

Biography
Born in Málaga, Spain, Palomeque was signed by Italian Serie A club Bologna in July 2012. He was a player of the reserve team. On 3 August 2013 Palomeque was signed by Como in a temporary deal. On 8 January 2014 he was signed by Paganese in another loan.

On 18 July 2014 Palomeque and Alessandro Marchi were signed by Cremonese in a temporary deal and definitive deal respectively.

On 31 August 2015 Palomeque was re-signed by Paganese in a temporary deal.

On 16 August 2016 he was signed by Lupa Roma F.C. on loan.

On 12 August 2018 he returned to Italy, signing with Cavese.

References

External links
 

1994 births
Living people
Footballers from Málaga
Spanish footballers
Association football defenders
Serie C players
Bologna F.C. 1909 players
Como 1907 players
Paganese Calcio 1926 players
U.S. Cremonese players
S.S.D. Lucchese 1905 players
Lupa Roma F.C. players
Cavese 1919 players
Segunda División B players
Tercera División players
Málaga CF players
Linares Deportivo footballers
CD El Ejido players
Spanish expatriate footballers
Expatriate footballers in Italy
Spanish expatriate sportspeople in Italy